All My Fault may refer to:

"All My Fault", song by Fenix TX from Lechuza (album)
"All My Fault", song by Gable from Tracing Faces